Demetris Kyprianou (born February 2, 1993) is a Cypriot football midfielder who currently plays for Ethnikos Achna.

External links
 

Living people
1993 births
Cypriot footballers
Association football midfielders
AEK Larnaca FC players
Alki Larnaca FC players
Ethnikos Achna FC players
Ermis Aradippou FC players
Cypriot First Division players